Euphaedra paradoxa is a butterfly in the family Nymphalidae. It is found in Kenya (from the south-western part of the country to the shores of Lake Victoria), Uganda and north-western Tanzania. The habitat consists of forests.

Description
 
E. paradoxa Neave. Forewing above glossy greenish black with narrow dirty white subapical band and red-brown hindmarginal spot; hindwing above dull red-brown with narrow black marginal band, with greenish reflection, and light green submarginal spots. Under surface light olive-green; forewing with white subapical band; distal part of the hindwing lighter green with indistinct greenish submarginal spots. Uganda.

Similar species
Other members of the Euphaedra preussi species group q.v.

References

Butterflies described in 1904
paradoxa